Skeptical Inquirer is a bimonthly American general-audience magazine published by the Committee for Skeptical Inquiry (CSI) with the subtitle: The Magazine for Science and Reason.

Mission statement and goals
Writer and skeptic Daniel Loxton, writing in 2013 about the mission and goals of the skeptical movement, criticized the idea that people wanted to read about the paranormal, Uri Geller and crystal skulls not being relevant any longer. Paul Kurtz in 2009 seemed to share this sentiment and stated that the organization would still research some paranormal subjects as they have expertise in this area, but they would begin to investigate other areas. S.I. "has reached an historic juncture: the recognition that there is a critical need to change our direction." While editor Frazier did expand the scope of the magazine to include topics less paranormal and more that were an attack on science and critical thinking such as climate change denialism, conspiracy theories and the influence of the alt-med movement, Frazier also added that "paranormal beliefs are still widespread" and quoted surveys that state that the public, given a list of ten general paranormal topics, will select four as topics they believe in. While the general skeptic community believes that we should not waste more time debunking the paranormal, topics long ago discredited, Frazier says "millions of Americans accept them today."

Writing for Scientific American, cognitive scientist Douglas Hofstadter states that the purpose of Skeptical Inquirer magazine is to "combat nonsense... nonsensical claims are routinely smashed to smithereens." He writes that articles are written for everyone that can read English—no special knowledge or expertise is needed; the only requirement is "curiosity about truth".

History
The magazine was originally titled The Zetetic (from the Greek meaning "skeptical seeker" or "inquiring skeptic"), and was originally edited by Marcello Truzzi.  About a year after its inception a schism developed between the editor Truzzi and the rest of the Committee for the Scientific Investigation of Claims of the Paranormal (CSICOP). The side represented by CSICOP was more "firmly opposed to nonsense, more willing to go on the offensive and to attack supernatural claims" and the other side ("The relativist faction (one member)", i.e. Truzzi) wanted science and pseudoscience to exist "happily together". Truzzi left to start The Zetetic Scholar and CSICOP changed the magazine's name to Skeptical Inquirer.

Loxton speculates on the answer to the question that if CSICOP was not the first skeptical publication, why is it considered to be the "'birth of modern skepticism' (at least for the English-speaking world)"? He writes that it was because CSICOP organized "this scholarship collectively [and] comprised a distinct field of study." The organization was the first to establish "best practices... specialist experts... buildings... periodicals and professional writers and researchers."

Magazine content

2009 Jan/Feb – 2020 May/June art director Christopher S. Fix until his death in March 2021.

The magazine contains several regular columns (and contributors). These have changed over the years as follows:

Print magazine columns and columnists
 Notes of a Fringe-Watcher (originally titled, Notes of a Psi-Watcher) – Martin Gardner, 1983–2010
 Investigative Files – Joe Nickell, 1995–present
 Psychic Vibrations – Robert Sheaffer, 1977–2017
 Notes of a Strange World – Massimo Polidoro, 2002–present
 Thinking About Science – Massimo Pigliucci, 2002–2015
 Skeptical Inquiree – Ben Radford, 2006–present
 Science Watch – Kenneth Krause, 2010–present
 The Science of Medicine – Steven Novella, 2010
 The Science of Science Communication – Matthew Nisbet, 2016–present
 Behavior & Belief – Stuart Vyse, 2016–present
 The Last Laugh – Ian Patrick Harris, 2017–present
 Reality Is the Best Medicine – Harriet Hall, 2018 (began with issue 42.5)

Online magazine columns and columnists
The magazine's website includes current articles, as well as an archive dating back to 1994. A small selection of articles also have Spanish versions available. Most articles are organized into the following columns:
 Special Report – Various columnists, 2007–present
 Curiouser and Curiouser – Kylie Sturgess, 2010–present
 Guerrilla Skepticism – Susan Gerbic, 2013–present
 Behavior & Belief – Stuart Vyse, 2014–present
 Conference Report – Various columnists, 2014–present
 SkepDoc's Corner – Harriet Hall, 2015–present
 Consumer Health – William M. London, 2015–present
 CSICon – Susan Gerbic and others, 2016–present
 The Well-Known Skeptic – Rob Palmer, 2018–present
 The Wide World of Science – Jamie Hale, 2018–present
 A Closer Look – Kenny Biddle, 2018–present
 European Skeptics Chronicles – Annika Merkelbach, 2018–present
 The Thoughtful Conduit – Russ Dobler, 2018–present
 In Memoriam – Various columnists, 2019–present
 Letter to America – Wendy M. Grossman, 2019–present
 But What Do I Know – Ada McVean, 2020–present
 The Skeptic's Guide to Sports Science – Nick Tiller, 2021–present

Influence
Several notable skeptics have described the magazine as influential to the early stages of their development as scientific skeptics.  In 1995, Perry DeAngelis and Steven Novella were friends that played Dungeons and Dragons together until DeAngelis noticed a Skeptical Inquirer magazine on the table in Novella's condo. DeAngelis, also an avid reader of the magazine, pointed out the back page to Novella and said "What is missing?" DeAngelis stated that what was missing was a Connecticut skeptic group, he said "we should do this" to which Novella agreed. They started the New England Skeptical Society and eventually the Skeptic's Guide to the Universe (SGU) podcast.

Writing for Scientific American, Douglas Hofstadter asked the question, why would Skeptical Inquirer succeed when the only people who read it are people who do not believe in the paranormal? The answer, he says, lies in the back of the magazine in the "Letters to the Editor" section. "Many people write in to say how vital the magazine has been to them, their friends and their students. High school teachers are among the most frequent writers of thank-you notes to the magazine's editors, but I have also seen enthusiastic letters from members of the clergy, radio talk-show hosts and people in many other professions."

Daniel Loxton, in his essay "Ode to Joy" about discovering Skeptical Inquirer magazine as a freshman at his University writes...

Levy and Olynyk art project
Inspired by the four decades of Skeptical Inquirer magazine, an exhibition titled Some Provocations from Skeptical Inquirers by artists Ellen Levy and Patricia Olynyk, was held at the Baruch College Mishkin Gallery in February 2016. Reviewer Eileen G'Sell wrote that the artists "plumb the depths of the murky ontological sea that is empirical belief." Writing for The Brooklyn Rail, reviewer William Corwin stated that the artwork represented "this built-in confrontation between fact and fiction (which) was the basis of the Skeptical Inquirer itself and its playful willingness to consider the most unlikely phenomena."

Pensar
In June 2020, CFI announced the "newly launched CFI online publication", Pensar, "the Spanish language magazine for science, reason, and freethought." It is published by Alejandro Borgo, director of CFI Argentina.

Photo gallery

See also
 CSICon
 Skeptic (U.S. magazine)
 The Skeptic (UK magazine)
 The Skeptic's Dictionary
 Skeptical movement
 Snopes.com

References

External links
 

1976 establishments in the United States
Bimonthly magazines published in the United States
Quarterly magazines published in the United States
Science and technology magazines published in the United States
Biannual magazines published in the United States
Magazines established in 1976
Magazines published in New York (state)
Paranormal magazines
Scientific skepticism mass media